The Jo Richardson Community School, often referred to as Jo Richardson or simply JRCS, is a secondary school in Dagenham, East London. The headteacher is Lisa Keane. The school is named in honour of MP Jo Richardson.

Notable former pupils
 Harry Derbidge (The Only Way is Essex)
 Benik Afobe (Millwall F.C.)
 Jesy Nelson (former member of Little Mix)
 Sam Montgomery (The Only Way is Essex)

External links
http://www.jorichardson.org.uk/

Secondary schools in the London Borough of Barking and Dagenham
Community schools in the London Borough of Barking and Dagenham
Educational institutions established in 2002
2002 establishments in England